Street of Shadows is a 1953 British film noir written and directed by Richard Vernon. The film stars Cesar Romero and features an early performance by Kay Kendall.

Plot
Luigi, the owner of a Soho saloon, is romancing an unhappily married socialite, Barbara Gale. He is accused of the murder of his former girlfriend Angela, who was found stabbed in his apartment. He evades the police and asks his friend Limpy for help, but Limpy is revealed to be Angela's killer.

Cast
 Cesar Romero as Luigi
 Kay Kendall as Barbara Gale
 Edward Underdown as Det. Insp. Johnstone
 Victor Maddern as Limpy
 Bill Travers as Nigel Langley
 Simone Silva as Angela Abbe
 Liam Gaffney as Constable Fred Roberts
 Robert Cawdron as Det. Sgt. Hadley
 John Penrose as Gerald Gale
 Molly Hamley-Clifford as "Starry" Darrell
 Eileen Way as Mrs. Thoms
 Paul Hardtmuth as J.M. Mayall
 Tony Sympson as Nikki
 Rose McLaren as Rose
 Michael Kelly as Merchant Seaman West
 Fred Griffiths as Cab Driver
 Harry Purvis as Darrell 
 Lionel King as The Cardsharp

References

External links
 
 

1953 films
British crime films
1953 crime films
Films set in London
British black-and-white films
Films scored by Eric Spear
1950s English-language films
1950s British films